Albert Lane may refer to:

 Albert Lane (cricketer) (1885–1948), English cricketer
 Albert Lane (politician) (1873–1950), Australian politician
 Albert G. Lane, American educator
 A.S. Lane (Albert Stephen Lane, 1904–1982), Australian rugby league player